Michael Nolan (30 November 1925 – 14 December 2009) was an Irish Catholic priest and psychologist.

Early training as priest
John Robert Michael Nolan was born in Birmingham in 1925. He attended St. Vincent's C.B.S. school in Dublin and then transferred to the Holy Cross College (Dublin) (1944-1947) to train for the priesthood. He completed his studies in the Pontifical Irish College and was ordained as a priest in the Archbasilica of Saint John Lateran, Rome by Cardinal Clemente Micara on 10 March 1951.  His first appointment was as Chaplain to the Sacred Heart Convent, Mount Anville (1951 – 52).  He returned to St. Vincent's C.B.S. school for a short period before being appointed Assistant Priest to Coolock (1952 – 1954).  From 1954 – 1956 he undertook further studies in the Teutonic College, Rome. He was an advisor to the Archbishop of Dublin and also the exorcist for the diocese. On his retirement in 1990, he was conferred with the title Monsignor.

Work as a psychologist
In 1956, on his return to Ireland he was appointed lecturer in University College Dublin (1956 – 1957) before going to the University of Cambridge (1957 – 1959) from which he obtained First Class degree in Psychology. He returned to teaching at University College Dublin. From 1976 to 1980 he was President of the Mater Dei Institute of Education.

In 1984, he was appointed Professor of Logic and Psychology at University College Dublin, succeeding Eamonn O’Doherty. He retired in 1990 and was succeeded by Noel Sheehy.

Nolan was a founding member of the Psychological Society of Ireland which was established in 1970. He was elected President of the Society in 1973.

After his retirement he was Honorary Secretary of the UCD Retired Staff Association: Maurice Kennedy Research Centre.

He died 14 December 2009.

Heritage
The School of Psychology at University College Dublin annually awards the Michael Nolan Medal for best final year project submitted by a student in the BSc Psychology programme.

Some publications
 Nolan, M. (1993). Church, State and Theology in the European Community.
 Nolan, M. (1997). The myth of soulless women. First Things
 Nolan, M. (1998). What Aquinas never said about women. First Things.
 Nolan, M. (2006). Do women have souls?

References

1925 births
2009 deaths
Alumni of Clonliffe College
Pontifical Irish College alumni
Alumni of the University of Cambridge
Academics of University College Dublin
20th-century Irish Roman Catholic priests
Irish psychologists
20th-century psychologists